Events from the year 1723 in Ireland.

Incumbent
Monarch: George I

Events

March 12 – the title of Viscount Palmerston is created in the Peerage of Ireland for the politician Henry Temple.
December 14 – Bernard O'Gara is selected to succeed Francis Burke as Roman Catholic Archbishop of Tuam. 
The first portion of Dr Steevens' Hospital is opened at Kilmainham, Dublin.
Avoca Handweavers, Ireland's oldest surviving business, is established in County Wicklow.

Births
Mervyn Archdall, antiquary (d. 1791)
Approximate date – William Greatrakes, lawyer (d. 1781)

Deaths
February 11 – Captain Hildebrand Alington, 5th Baron Alington, soldier, last Baron Alington of the first creation (b. 1641)
June 2 – Esther Vanhomrigh, Jonathan Swift's "Vanessa" (b. c. 1688)
August – William Handcock, politician (b. 1676)
August/September – Francis Burke, Roman Catholic Archbishop of Tuam
September 16 – Gustavus Hamilton, 1st Viscount Boyne, soldier and politician (b. 1642)
December 22 – Mary Joseph Butler, Benedictine abbess (b. 1641)
Henry Colley, politician (b. c. 1685)
Micheál Ó Mordha, Roman Catholic priest, philosopher and educationalist (b. c. 1639)

References

 
Years of the 18th century in Ireland
Ireland
1720s in Ireland